is a railway station in Honchō, Okaya, Nagano Prefecture, Japan, jointly operated by JR Central and JR East. It is managed by JR East.

Lines
Okaya Station is a terminus of the old route of the Chuo Main Line (Okaya-Shiojiri branch), and is 210.4 km from Tokyo Station. A small number of trains on the Iida Line also continue past the nominal terminus of that line at Tatsuno to stop at this station and the previous Kawagishi Station.

Station layout
The station consists of one ground-level side platform with a cut-out serving two tracks, and one ground-level island platform serving two tracks. The platforms are connected to the station building by a footbridge. The station has a Midori no Madoguchi staffed ticket office.

Platforms

Bus terminal

Highway buses
 Chūō Kōsoku Bus; For Shinjuku Station
 Alpen Suwa; For Kyōto Station, Momoyamadai Station, Shin-Ōsaka Station, and Umeda Station

History
The station opened on 25 November 1905. With the privatization of Japanese National Railways (JNR) on 1 April 1987, the station came under the control of JR East.

Passenger statistics
In fiscal 2015, the station was used by an average of 3,167 passengers daily (boarding passengers only).

Surrounding area
Nagano Expressway

See also
 List of railway stations in Japan

References

External links

JR East station information 

Railway stations in Nagano Prefecture
Chūō Main Line
Iida Line
Railway stations in Japan opened in 1905
Stations of East Japan Railway Company
Okaya, Nagano